Quarter to Six (Reva Le'Shesh) is the fourth studio album by Israeli music group The Idan Raichel Project. It was released in March 2013 by Helicon in Israel and Cumbancha worldwide. The album features guest appearances by Andreas Scholl, Tamir Nachshon, Anat Ben Hamo, Idan Haviv, Ana Moura, Mira Awad, Vieux Farka Touré, Amir Dadon, Marta Gómez, Shai Tsabari, Liat Zion, and Ishay Ribo. It peaked at ninth place in Billboard's World Albums chart. In 2015, the album was certified 4× platinum in Israel, selling 120,000 copies.

Track listing

Charts

Certifications

References

2013 albums
Idan Raichel albums
Helicon Records albums
Cumbancha albums